This article is about the list of Kabuscorp Sport Clube do Palanca players.  Kabuscorp Sport Clube do Palanca is an Angolan football (soccer) club based in Luanda, Angola and plays at Estádio dos Coqueiros.  The club was established in 1994.

2011–2019
Kabuscorp S.C.P. players 2011–2019

2004–2010
Kabuscorp S.C.P. players 2004–2010

1994–2000
Kabuscorp S.C.P. players 1994–2000

External links
 Squad at official website
 Girabola.com profile
 Zerozero.pt profile
 Soccerway profile
 Facebook profile

References

Kabuscorp S.C.P.
Kabuscorp S.C.P. players
Association football player non-biographical articles